Ashley Gregory Avildsen (born November 5, 1981) is an American film director, screenwriter, producer, and the founder and CEO of Sumerian Records and Sumerian Films. The son of director John G. Avildsen, he wrote and directed the film American Satan (2017) and the scripted series Paradise City (2022).

Sumerian Records 
Sumerian Records (currently located in Los Angeles) was founded in 2006 by Ash Avildsen. Initially, the label was run out of his one-bedroom apartment in Venice Beach, beginning with the bands The Faceless and Stick To Your Guns. Sumerian has since released over 100 albums, expanded their roster to feature a diverse collective of over 40 artists, and in 2016 celebrated their 10-year anniversary as a successful independent label.

Piracy controversy 
On March 22, 2011, Avildsen released a video in which he argued against music piracy. This led to some controversy as the video was perceived to be an ad for Born of Osiris' then new record The Discovery. A second point was made of the fact that during the 1990s, Avildsen was active in the software piracy warez scene. He went by the nickname The Krazy Little Punk and from 1995 lead the games release group Release on Rampage (ROR), having gained infamy for repackaging a beta release of Quake and passing it off as the final retail release in a failed attempt to claim as being the first to illegally release the game. Jason Fisher of the heavy metal blog The Gauntlet, and during the 1990s also a member of ROR, responded to the video, claiming that "Ash alone has easily cost companies millions of dollars." He lamented Avildsen's lack of disclosure on the matter.

Filmography 
What Now (2015) - Released Digitally / VOD
American Satan (2017)
Paradise City (2021)

References

External links 

American chief executives in the media industry
American film directors
American screenwriters
American film producers
American people of Norwegian descent
1981 births
Living people